Andreas Wieland (born 16 August 1983) is an Austrian retired footballer and manager. He is the current manager Challenger Pro League club of Beerschot.

References

1983 births
Living people
Austrian football managers
FC Juniors OÖ managers
LASK managers
Austrian expatriate football managers
Expatriate football managers in Belgium
Austrian expatriate sportspeople in Belgium